The Durban Indian Municipal Employees' Society (DIMES) was a trade union representing municipal workers of Indian origin, in Durban in South Africa.

The union was founded in 1936, and by 1943, it had 2,450 members.  It affiliated to the South African Trades and Labour Council.

In the 1940s, the union was led by Billy Peters, a member of the Communist Party of South Africa.  It opposed apartheid, and in 1955 was a founding affiliate of the inclusive South African Congress of Trade Unions (SACTU).  One of the federation's larger affiliates, in 1962, it had about 1,600 members.  However, the union's leadership had moved to the right, and when SACTU was banned, they switched its membership to the more conservative Trade Union Council of South Africa.

In 1980, the union was permitted to accept all workers, regardless of ethnicity, and in recognition of this, it changed its name to the Durban Integrated Municipal Employees' Society.  After obtaining a 20% pay increase in 1988, it attracted many members of the formerly white union, and grew rapidly.  In 1990, it became the Democratic Integrated Municipal Employees' Society, and by 1992, it had about 13,000 members.  On 1 July 1994, it merged into the South African Municipal Workers' Union.

References

Durban
Municipal workers' trade unions
Trade unions established in 1936
Trade unions disestablished in 1994
Trade unions in South Africa